August Sackenheim (5 August 1905 – 19 April 1979) was a German international footballer.

References

1905 births
1979 deaths
Association football forwards
German footballers
Germany international footballers